D. C. Thomson may refer to:

 DC Thomson, a publishing company
 David Couper Thomson, founder of the publishing company